Draim AB was a Swedish developer and publisher of fantasy-based tactical card games, headquartered in Nacka, Sweden. It was founded in 2003 as Draim HB and shuttered in or around 2008. Its most famous, maybe only, game title was the trading card game Draim arena which was released in the autumn of 2006 and was discontinued a few years later. It is now out of print. According to the now-defunct official webpage Draim Charta Nondum Draim also had plans to act as a publisher for fantasy comics in Sweden.

There were also plans for a follow-up product, a board game named World, according to the official website. Nothing was mentioned about the contents of this game, and it was never released before the website was closed.

Web community 

Draim had a Swedish-language web community where the users could get in touch with the people behind the games. This was a part of the company's "open source" ideology, meaning that the users could contribute to:

 Creating the mythology and the world of Draimia behind the games
 Coming up with ideas on how to change the Draim Charta Nondum homepage
 Coming with ideas for new cards in the Draim Arena series, and
 Coming up with ideas for events, new games and new products

External links 
 Official web page

Fantasy games
Collectible card games